Aleksandr Nikolayevich Balandin (born July 30, 1953) is a Russian cosmonaut. He is married with two children. He was selected as a cosmonaut on December 1, 1978, and retired on October 17, 1994.

He flew as a flight engineer on Soyuz TM-9.

He worked at NPO Energia until 1994, and was then President of Lendint-Association until 2000.

Biography 
He was born on July 30, 1953 in Fryazino. In 1970, he graduated from high school in Fryazino, and in 1976, the Bauman Moscow State Technical University, with specialty - Flight Dynamics and Control. He worked as an engineer in the Moscow region at the Scientific Production Association (SPA) "Energy".

On December 8, 1978, he was enrolled in the cosmonaut detachment (the 5th recruitment of civilian specialists from SPA Energia), and was prepared for flying at the Buran reusable spacecraft (1979-1984), Soyuz-TM spacecraft and Mir space station. In September 1989 - flight engineer of the backup crew of the Soyuz TM-8. On September 5, 1989, Soyuz TM-8 Union reached the orbit with the main crew (Aleksandr Serebrov and Aleksandr Viktorenko).

Awards 
Hero of the Soviet Union
Pilot-Cosmonaut of the USSR
Order of Lenin
Medal "For Merit in Space Exploration"
Order of Bernardo O'Higgins

References 

1953 births
Living people
Soviet cosmonauts
Heroes of the Soviet Union
People from Fryazino
Recipients of the Medal "For Merit in Space Exploration"
Spacewalkers
Mir crew members